Fereshta Kazemi  is an Afghan–born American film actress.

Early life

Born in Kabul, Afghanistan, Kazemi moved to the U.S. with her family. She was raised in New York and the California Bay Area. After high school, Kazemi won an acting and academic scholarship to Marymount Manhattan College in NYC, where she studied acting and writing. Kazemi also earned a degree in Philosophy & Cultural Anthropology from the University of California, Davis. She continued graduate acting and screenwriting studies at Academy of Art University and earned an MBA from Chapman University, emphasizing in Film Production.

Career

In 2009, Kazemi held a lead role in Heal, a film about conflict in Afghanistan which has won over twenty international and domestic film festival awards, including winner of the Best Science Fiction/Fantasy Category at Comic Con International Film Festival (2011), winner of the Frank D. Capra award (2011), and the Humanitarian Award at the Cleveland International Film Festival (2011).

In 2014, Kazemi was the main character in Targeting, a U.S. psychological thriller feature film playing a young Afghan immigrant wife in the U.S. Kazemi. In this film she performed the first on screen kiss for an Afghan actress and was called  a "trailblazer" by NBC.

Kazemi's work was photographed in a series by Pulitzer prize winning photographer Carolyn Cole while in Afghanistan.

In 2013, Fereshta played the leading role in The Icy Sun, a film about rape in Afghanistan. NBC News said her film "breaks new ground for Afghanistan, where victims of rape can be forced to marry their attackers to preserve their families' honor".

Kazemi is working on a documentary about Acting in Afghanistan.

In 2013, she was awarded a Best Actress Award for her role in "The Icy Sun" at the "2nd Afghanistan Human Rights Film Festival".

References

External links
 Finnbay Profile "Interview with Fereshta Kazemi, An Afghan Actor in Hollywood" (May 2014)
 Toronto Star: "Meet Afghanistan's Most Controversial Actress" (Feb 2014)
 Al Jazeera America Profile: "Actress Shakes Up Afghan Cinema in Taboo Topics and Short Skirts" (Jan 2014)
 Al Jazeera English: "Film aims to break rape taboo" (Sept 11, 2013)
 "Afghan Female Stars Defy the Clerics" (Aug 2013)
 Khaama Press: "Afghan actress appears in first movie that openly deals with sexual violence" (Jan 2014)
 Afghan Zariza: "I have pulled back some of the taboos around rape that hurt the hearts of Afghan women" (April 2014)
 WUNC "The Story: Afghan Actress" Interviewed by Dick Gordon (Feb 22, 2013)

Afghan film actresses
1979 births
Living people
21st-century Afghan actresses
People from Kabul
University of California, Davis alumni